Finish Ticket is an American musical group from Alameda, California. The members are Brendan Hoye (vocals), Alex DiDonato (guitar), and Gabe Stein (drums). The band was a staple in the local San Francisco music scene, self-releasing two EPs and an album and playing at local venues and music festivals. They gathered national fame after signing to Elektra Records in 2014, releasing their debut EP with the label in 2015. They have toured both nationally in the United States and in Europe and have performed with artists such as The Black Keys, Twenty One Pilots, Fitz and the Tantrums, AWOLNATION, and Ed Sheeran.

History
Finish Ticket began when founding members and twin brothers Brendan and Michael Hoye were still attending Alameda High School.  They started the group along with guitarist Alex DiDonato and were later joined by brothers Gabe and Nick Stein in 2012. Early in their career, the group performed at local festivals and headlined local venues. The group had a brief hiatus when the members went to college, reuniting after a year in order to pursue their careers in music.

Finish Ticket continued performing and opening for big names in one-off shows. They also self-released two EPs, Life Underwater in 2009 and Shake a Symphony in 2010. They followed up with a self-release album called Tears You Apart in 2013. They made the rounds at music festivals including playing at Outside Lands Music and Arts Festival and venues such as the Shoreline Amphitheater in Mountain View, California. The group's album Tears You Apart was picked up by Elektra Records who signed the group to a deal and re-released the album in 2014. They traveled to London to record their debut EP for the label which was released in 2015. Following recording, Finish Ticket toured Europe, performing shows in Germany, France, Austria, and Netherlands. They were also recognized as The Best of What's Next by Paste Magazine.

In 2015, Finish Ticket was the opening act for the national Blurryface Tour, headlined by Twenty One Pilots. They returned from the tour as the headliner for a show at the Great American Music Hall. In early 2016, the group embarked on the "Ones To Watch" tour with co-headliners, Vinyl Theatre. Beginning in September 2016,the group performed a headlining tour with the opening bands being Run River North and Irontom. As of August 2017, the group is working on a new album.

On November 9, 2018, Finish Ticket announced that Michael Hoye and Nick Stein had left the band, leaving Brendan Hoye, Alex DiDonato, and Gabe Stein as full time members. The latter three re-located to Los Angeles around the same time. In the same year, they also parted ways with their record label Elektra Records.  

Finish Ticket made their return to the live stage in May of 2019, announcing two shows in San Francisco and Los Angeles. They later announced a full length U.S tour that took place between September 8th to 28th of that same year. On June 27th, 2019, the band announced their first new music since the release of When Night Becomes Day in 2015 with the track "Dream Song", which was released July 12th. The songs "Ceiling Won't Break" and "Black Horse" were subsequently released in the following months.

Discography

Studio albums

Extended plays

Singles

References

External links
 Finish Ticket official

Elektra Records artists
Musical groups from San Francisco
2008 establishments in California
Musical groups established in 2008
Alternative rock groups from California
Musical quintets